The Reverend Sir Henry Bate Dudley, 1st Baronet (25 August 1745 – 1 February 1824) was a British minister, magistrate and playwright.  He was born in Fenny Compton, Warwickshire, but in 1763 his father moved the family to Essex to take up a Rectory at North Fambridge near Chelmsford.  On his father's death, Bate Dudley took over the ministry. In Essex, he owned Bradwell Lodge, a Tudor country house near Bradwell-on-Sea and engaged the architect John Johnson to construct a large extension attached to the south side of the original house, designed in a Neoclassical style. 

Bate Dudley was a great supporter of, and chronicled the life of the artist Thomas Gainsborough .  Much of this work was published in the Morning Herald which Bate Dudley owned and ran, and the Morning Post with which he was also associated but had left to set up the Herald after a disagreement in 1780.  Much of this was republished in 1915 in Life of Gainsborough by William Whitley.

After meeting James Townley and being influenced by his farce High Life Below Stairs Bate Dudley started writing scripts for comic operas. Following his The Rival Candidates, his libretto for The Flitch of Bacon (1778) was the first of his collaboration with the composer William Shield, whom he assisted in bringing to prominence. The Shield and Dudley operas also included The Woodman (1791) and  Travellers in Switzerland (1794), and were produced at Covent Garden.

For a time, between 1804 and 1812, Bate Dudley moved from Essex to Ireland due to financial difficulties and took up a Rectory in Kilscoran and Kilglass. He returned to England in 1812 to take up a rectory in Willingham, Cambridgeshire. In October of the same year he was created a baronet, of Sloane Street, Chelsea, in the County of Middlesex, and of Kilscoran House in the County of Wexford.

Bate Dudley played a part in the suppression of the Ely and Littleport riots of May 1816. These were part of a more widespread discontent which affected Norfolk, Suffolk, Huntingdonshire and Cambridgeshire.  It had its roots in discontent over the enclosure of the fenlands, but the high price of bread, poor pay of agricultural workers, and unemployment of soldiers returning from the Napoleonic wars were also factors.  Bate Dudley, who was a magistrate at Ely at the time, organised opposition to the rioters at Littleport, near Ely, where the insurgents were defeated, but only after troops opened fire on them.

Comic operas
Sir Henry Bate Dudley, The Rival Candidates, 1775.
William Shield, Sir Henry Bate Dudley, The Flitch of Bacon, 1779.
William Shield, Sir Henry Bate Dudley, The Woodman, 1791.
William Shield, Sir Henry Bate Dudley, Travellers in Switzerland, 1794.

References

Bibliography
s.n., "Obituary: Sir Henry Bate Dudley, Bart.", The Gentleman's magazine, pp. 273–276, 638–639, Vol. 135, 1824
Edward Royle, Revolutionary Britannia?: reflections on the threat of revolution in Britain, 1789-1848, Manchester University Press, 2000 .
William T. Whitley, Art of England 1821-1837, Read Books, 2007 .

1745 births
1824 deaths
Baronets in the Baronetage of the United Kingdom
19th-century English Anglican priests
English dramatists and playwrights
English justices of the peace
English male dramatists and playwrights
People from Stratford-on-Avon District
People from Maldon District